Andrew Carter (born 13 December 1939) is an English composer, conductor and arranger.

Biography
Andrew Carter was born in Leicester on 13 December 1939. He studied music at the University of Leeds before moving to York and joining the choir at York Minster as a bass. Whilst there, in 1965 he founded the Chapter House Choir, a mixed voice ensemble that achieved national renown under his direction of seventeen years. After spending a year conducting and adjudicating in New Zealand (1984), he returned to England to focus on composition.

Oxford University Press have published more than fifty of his compositions over a period of association spanning twenty-five years. The famous Nine Lessons and Carols service broadcast annually on the BBC by the Choir of King's College, Cambridge, has included several of his carols, including A maiden most gentle and Mary's Magnificat.

A notable moment in Carter's musical career was a commission in 1997 to write a mass (Missa Sancti Pauli) for the tercentenary celebration of St Paul's Cathedral in London.  In 2007, he composed a 22-variation Passacaglia for organ to mark the 90th birthday of the former York Minster organist Francis Jackson.

He travels extensively in Europe and Australia and New Zealand as a choral director.

Compositions

Choral works
A maiden most gentle
An Affirmation
Mary's Magnificat
Christ is the morning star
Benedicite
Te Deum
Musick's Jubilee
Horizons
Song of Stillness
Laudate Dominum
The Southwell Service
Missa Sancti Pauli
The Light of the World
Hodie Christus natus est
Rejoice in the Lord alway (2001)
O mistress mine (2005)

Organ works
Organ Concerto (2005)
Toccata on Veni Emmanuel
Passacaglia (2007)

Other works
Three Nonsensical Songs for upper voices and orchestra
A Little Suite for Heather for Treble Recorder and Piano (Forsyth Publishing)

References

External links
Andrew Carter's homepage
Andrew Carter at Guild Music
Andrew Carter at OUP

English composers
English conductors (music)
British male conductors (music)
Living people
1939 births
21st-century British conductors (music)
21st-century British male musicians